Les Scouts du Cameroun is the national Scouting organization of Cameroon. Scouting in Cameroon was started in 1937. The association was founded in 1973 through the merger of five predecessors. Cameroonese Scouting became a member of the World Organization of the Scout Movement in 1971. The coeducational "Scouts du Cameroun" has 4,561 members as of 2008.

Scouting in Cameroon is noted for its emphasis on community service, good citizenship and many conservation projects. 

In 1981, Solomon T. Muna was awarded the Bronze Wolf, the only distinction of the World Organization of the Scout Movement, awarded by the World Scout Committee for exceptional services to world Scouting.

Program
The organization is divided in four sections according to age:
 Louveteaux (Cub Scouts) - ages 6 to 11
 Éclaireurs (Scouts) - ages 11 to 15
 Scouts aînés (Senior Scouts) - ages 15 to 19
 Routiers (Rover Scouts) - ages 19 to 26

The Scout Motto is Sois Prêt (Be Prepared) in French.

See also
Association des Guides du Cameroun

References

External links
 Official website
 Badge Catalog of Cameroun

Scouting and Guiding in Cameroon
World Organization of the Scout Movement member organizations
Youth organizations established in 1973